Route 348 is a collector road in the Canadian province of Nova Scotia.

It is located in the northeastern part of the province and connects Little Harbour at Route 289 with Melrose at Trunk 7.

In the town of Trenton it runs on "North Main Street," "Main Street" and "Trenton Road."  In the neighbouring town of New Glasgow it runs on "North Provost Street," "Provost Street" and "Jury Street" (southbound), "Archimedes Street" (northbound), and the "East River Road."

Communities 

Little Harbour
Chance Harbour
Pictou Landing
Boat Harbour West 37
Hillside
Trenton
New Glasgow
Plymouth
Churchville
Springville
Bridgeville
St. Pauls

Glencoe
Iron Rock
Sunnybrae
Caledonia
Lower Caledonia
Upper Smithfield
Smithfield
Glenelg
Melrose

See also
List of Nova Scotia provincial highways

References

348
348
348
Transport in New Glasgow, Nova Scotia